Zakir Kathrada (born 17 August 1991) is a South African cricketer. He made his first-class debut for Western Province in the 2011–12 CSA Provincial Three-Day Challenge on 1 March 2012.

He was the leading run-scorer in the 2017–18 CSA Provincial One-Day Challenge tournament for Northern Cape, with 250 runs in eight matches.

References

External links
 

1991 births
Living people
South African cricketers
Griqualand West cricketers
Northern Cape cricketers
Western Province cricketers
Cricketers from Cape Town